Tatishchev may refer to:

 Dmitry Tatishchev
 Vasily Tatishchev
 4235 Tatishchev